Haska Meyna, also called Deh Bala District,  is a district in the south of Nangarhar Province, Afghanistan, bordering on Pakistan. Its population, which is 100% Pashtuns, was estimated at 50,595 in 2002, of whom 20,200 were children under 12. The district centre is Haska Meyna.

Haska Meyna is home to the Shinwari tribe, one of the largest Pashtun tribes. It was a stronghold of the Mujaheddin during the Soviet occupation of Afghanistan.

References

UNHCR District Profile, dated 2002-05-21, accessed 2006-07-13 (PDF).

External links
Map of Haska Meyna (Dih Bala) (PDF)

Districts of Nangarhar Province